American Metal is an upcoming American action film written and directed by Nicholas Maggio, in his feature film directorial debut. The film stars John Travolta, Stephen Dorff, Ashley Benson, Kevin Dillon, and Shiloh Fernandez. American Metal is set to be released by Saban Films in 2023.

Cast
 John Travolta
 Stephen Dorff
 Ashley Benson
 Kevin Dillon
 Shiloh Fernandez

Production
In May 2022, John Travolta, Stephen Dorff, Ashley Benson, Kevin Dillon, and Shiloh Fernandez were announced to have starred in Nicholas Maggio's directorial debut film American Metal. Principal photography wrapped by May 2022 in Georgia. Saban Films bought the film's distribution rights during the 2022 Cannes Film Festival.

Release
American Metal is scheduled to be released by Saban Films in 2023.

References

External links
 

Upcoming films
English-language films
2023 action adventure films
2020s English-language films
2023 action thriller films
2023 directorial debut films
2023 films
2023 independent films
American action films
Films set in Georgia (U.S. state)
Films shot in Georgia (U.S. state)
Saban Films films
Upcoming directorial debut films
Upcoming English-language films